OP or Op may refer to:

Arts and entertainment
 One Piece, a 1997 Japanese manga and anime
 Opposite prompt, a stage right prompt corner on a theatre stage
 Optimus Prime, a character from the Transformers franchise
 Op., short for opus number, used to denote one work of musical composition from many
 Original pronunciation, the phonology of Early Modern English, as used in William Shakespeare's time, specifically when used to perform his works in modern times.
 Out of print, a status of a book title at a publishing house

Businesses and organizations
 Operational planning, the process of planning short term measures in a company
 OP Financial Group, a Finnish company
 Oborový podnik ("specialized business"), a bygone Czechoslovak state designation for a business entity
 Ocean Pacific, a retail clothing company
 Oratory Preparatory School, in New Jersey, United States
 Dominican Order, a Catholic religious order
 Odisha Police, police patrol in Odisha, India

Internet
 Original post (or poster), the opening entry (or author thereof) in a thread or discussion in an internet forum
 Overpowered (game balance), in video games, when a particular aspect or character is lacking game balance

Mathematics and computers
 Op (statistics), a symbol used in probability mathematics
 Octagonal prism
 Over-provisioning, a phenomenon associated with solid state storage; see

Places
 Orchard Park, New York
 Overland Park, Kansas
 O'Brien Peak
 O'Cain Point
 O'Connor Peak
 O'Donnell Peak
 O'Fallon Park
 O'Higgins Park
 O'Leary Peak
 O'Neal Point
 O'Neill Peak
 O'Neill Point
 O'Neill Regional Park
 O'Shea Peak
 O'Sullivan Peak

Other uses
 Observation post, a position from which soldiers can watch enemy movements
 Old Pauline, an ex-pupil of St Paul's School, London
 Old Peterite, a former pupil of St Peter's School, York
 Orange Pekoe, a grade of black tea
 Organophosphate, the general name for esters of phosphoric acid
 Overall Position, the grade appointed to Queensland high-school graduates
 O.P. Anderson, a Swedish spirit of the aquavit type
 Opportunity point, a tennis term for an opportunity to potentially break serve when the score is 15–30

See also
 Op-amp, short for operational amplifier
 Op-ed, a newspaper opinion piece
 Operation (disambiguation)
 Operator (disambiguation)
 OPS (disambiguation)
 Ops (disambiguation)
 Op. cit., opere citato, or "in the work cited"
 0P (disambiguation) (zero p)